Henry Corbin (14 April 1903 – 7 October 1978) was a French philosopher, theologian, and Iranologist, professor of Islamic studies at the École pratique des hautes études. He was influential in extending the modern study of traditional Islamic philosophy from early falsafa to later and "mystical" figures such as Suhrawardi, Ibn Arabi, and Mulla Sadra Shirazi. 

Corbin was born in Paris in April 1903. Although Protestant by birth, he received a Catholic education, obtaining a certificate in Scholastic philosophy from the Catholic Institute of Paris at age 19. Three years later he took his "license de philosophie" under the Thomist Étienne Gilson. He also studied modern philosophy, including hermeneutics and phenomenology, becoming the first French translator of Martin Heidegger. In 1928, Louis Massignon (director of Islamic studies at the Sorbonne) introduced him to Suhrawardi, the 12th-century Persian Muslim thinker. This drew Corbin's interest to Iranian Islam, which he believed esoterically expressed older perennial elements related to Zoroastrianism and Platonism. In a late interview, Corbin said: "through my meeting with Suhrawardi, my spiritual destiny for the passage through this world was sealed. Platonism, expressed in terms of the Zoroastrian angelology of ancient Persia, illuminated the path that I was seeking."

Corbin regularly spent time in Iran, working with Shia thinkers such as Muhammad Husayn Tabatabai and Seyyed Hossein Nasr. He also became prominent in the Eranos circle of scholars initiated by Carl Jung, whose theories (such as the collective unconscious and active imagination) he appreciated. Aside from Islamic philosophy, Corbin wrote on Christian mysticism, especially Emanuel Swedenborg and the Holy Grail. His general work Histoire de la philosophie islamique (1964) decisively challenged the common European view that philosophy in the Islamic world declined after Ibn Rushd.

Life and work
The philosophical life and career of Corbin can be divided into three phases. The first is the 1920s and 1930s, when he was involved in learning and teaching western philosophy. The second is the years between 1939 and 1946, in which he studied Shahab al-Din Suhrawardi and the School of Illumination in Istanbul. The last phase begins in 1946 and lasts until his death, in which he studied and reintroduced eastern and Islamic philosophy.

In 1933 he married Stella Leenhardt. In 1938, he completed the first translation of one of Heidegger's works into French (Was ist Metaphysik?, as Qu’est-ce que la metaphysique?). In 1939 they traveled to Istanbul, and in 1945 to Tehran. They returned to Paris one year later in July 1946. In 1949, Corbin first attended the annual Eranos Conferences in Ascona, Switzerland. In 1954 he succeeded Louis Massignon in the Chair of Islam and the Religions of Arabia. From the 1950s on he spent autumn in Tehran, winter in Paris and spring in Ascona.

The three major works upon which his reputation largely rests in the English speaking world were first published in French in the 1950s: Avicenna and the Visionary Recital, Creative Imagination in the Sufism of Ibn 'Arabi and Spiritual Body and Celestial Earth. His later major work on Central Asian and Iranian Sufism appears in English with an Introduction by Zia Inayat Khan as The Man of Light in Iranian Sufism. His magnum opus is the four volume En Islam Iranien: Aspects spirituels et philosophiques. It has been translated into Persian twice by Dr Enshollah Rahmati and Reza Kuhkan from French (the 4th volume being still untranslated). He died on 7 October 1978.

Main themes
There are several main themes which together form the core of the spirituality that Corbin defends. The Imagination is the primary means to engage with Creation. Prayer is the "supreme act of the creative imagination". He considered himself a Protestant Christian but he abandoned a Christocentric view of history. The grand sweep of his theology of the Holy Spirit embraces Judaism, Christianity and Islam. He defended the central role assigned in theology for the individual as the finite image of the Unique Divine.

His mysticism is no world-denying asceticism but regards all of Creation as a theophany of the divine. This vision has much in common with what has become known as Creation Spirituality, and the figure of the Angel Holy Spirit is similar to what is sometimes called the Cosmic Christ.

Legacy and influence

Corbin's ideas have continued through colleagues, students and others influenced by his work. These include the following prolific scholars of Sufism and Islamic thought: Seyyed Hossein Nasr, William Chittick, Christian Jambet, Ali Amir-Moezzi, Hermann Landolt, Pierre Lory, James Cowan, James Morris, and Todd Lawson.  In England his influence has been felt in the work of Kathleen Raine, Phillip Sherrard and other members of the Temenos Academy. Corbin was an important source for the archetypal psychology of James Hillman and others who have developed the psychology of Carl Jung. In addition, Corbin was good friends with Jacques Lacan, the French reinterpreter of Sigmund Freud, which gave Lacan a familiarity with Islamic thought. The American literary critic Harold Bloom claims Corbin as a significant influence on his own conception of Gnosticism, and the American poet Charles Olson was a student of Corbin's Avicenna and the Visionary Recital. Corbin's friends and colleagues in France have established L'Association des Amis de Henry et Stella Corbin for the dissemination of his work through meetings and colloquia, and the publication of his posthumous writings.

Corbin's work has been criticized by a number of writers, including Steven M. Wasserstrom. Corbin's scholarly objectivity has been questioned on the basis of both a Shi'ite bias, and his theological agenda; he has been accused of being both ahistorically naive and dangerously politically reactionary; and he has been charged with being both an Iranian nationalist and an elitist in both his politics and his spirituality. Other writers, such as Lory and Subtelny, have written to defend Corbin.

Selected bibliography
 Avicenna and the Visionary Recital. Princeton University Press, 1960.
 Histoire de la philosophie Islamique. Gallimard, 1964. (Re-issued by Kegan Paul in 1993 as History of Islamic Philosophy ..)
 Creative Imagination in the Sufism of Ibn 'Arabi. Princeton University Press, 1969. (Re-issued in 1998 as Alone with the Alone.)
 En Islam Iranien: Aspects spirituels et philosophiques (4 vols.). Gallimard, 1971–73.
 Spiritual Body and Celestial Earth: From Mazdean Iran to Shi'ite Iran. Princeton University Press, 1977.
 Le Paradoxe du Monothéisme. l'Herne, 1981.
 Cyclical Time and Ismaili Gnosis. KPI, 1983.
 L'Homme et Son Ange: Initiation et Chevalerie Spirituelle. Fayard, 1983.
 Face de Dieu, Face de l'homme: Hermeneutique et soufisme. Flammarion, 1983.
 Temple and Contemplation. KPI, 1986.
 The Man of Light in Iranian Sufism. Omega Publications, 1994.
 Swedenborg and Esoteric Islam. Swedenborg Foundation, 1995.

See also 

Ahmad Fardid
Active imagination
Barzakh
Falsafa
Hossein Nasr
Iranistics
Martin Heidegger
Nader El-Bizri
Sufi studies
Temenos Academy Review

References

Further reading
 Adams, Charles J. "The Hermeneutics of Henry Corbin," in Approaches to Islam in Religious Studies, Martin, Ed., University of Arizona Press, 1985.
 Addas, Claude. Quest for the Red Sulphur: The Life of Ibn 'Arabi. Trans. Peter Kingsley. Islamic Texts Society, 1993.
 Algar, Hamid. "The Study of Islam: The Work of Henry Corbin." Religious Studies Review 6(2) 1980: 85–91.
 Avens, Roberts. "The Subtle Realm: Corbin, Sufism and Swedenborg," in Immanuel Swedenborg: A Continuing Vision, Edited by Robin Larson. Swedenborg Foundation, 1988.
 Amir-Moezzi, M., Christian Jambet and Pierre Lory, (eds). Henry Corbin: Philosophies et Sagesses des Religions du Livre. Brepols, 2005.
 Bamford, Christopher. "Esotericism Today: The Example of Henry Corbin," in Henry Corbin, The Voyage and the Messenger: Iran and Philosophy. North Atlantic Books, 1998.
 Bloom, Harold. Omens of Millennium: The Gnosis of Angels, Dreams and Resurrection. Riverhead Books, 1996.
 Brown, Norman O., "The Prophetic Tradition," and "The Apocalypse of Islam," in Apocalypse and/or Metamorphosis. University of California Press, 1991.
 Camilleri, Sylvain  and Proulx, Daniel.  « Martin Heidegger et Henry Corbin : lettres et documents (1930-1941) », in Bulletin heideggérien, vol. 4, 2014, p. 4-63.
 Cheetham, Tom. The World Turned Inside Out: Henry Corbin and Islamic Mysticism. Spring Journal Books, 2003.
 _ Green Man, Earth Angel: The Prophetic Tradition and the Battle for the Soul of the World. SUNY Press, 2005.
 _ After Prophecy: Imagination, Incarnation and the Unity of the Prophetic Tradition. Lectures for the Temenos Academy. Spring Journal Books, 2007.
 _ All the World an Icon: Henry Corbin and the Angelic Function of Beings, North Atlantic Books, 2012.
 _ Imaginal Love: The Meanings of Imagination in Henry Corbin and James Hillman, Spring Publications, 2015.
 Chittick, William. The Sufi Path of Knowledge: Ibn 'Arabi's Metaphysics of the Imagination. SUNY Press, 1989.
 Chodkiewicz, Michel. An Ocean without Shore: Ibn 'Arabi, the Book and the Law. Trans. David Streight. Islamic Texts Society, 1993.
 __ Seal of the Saints: Prophethood and Sainthood in the Doctrine of Ibn 'Arabi. Trans. Liadain Sherrard. Islamic Texts Society, 1993.
 Corbin, H. (1969). Creative Imagination in the Sufism of Ibn `Arabi. (Trans. R. Manheim. Original French, 1958.) Princeton, NJ. Princeton University Press.
 Corbin, H. (1972). "Mundus Imaginalis, the Imaginary and the Imaginal". Spring, 1972  pp. 1–19. New York:  Analytical Psychology Club of New York, Inc.
 Elmore, Gerald. Islamic Sainthood in the Fullness of Time: Ibn al-'Arabi's Book of the Fabulous Gryphon. Brill, 1998.
 Jambet, Christian, (Editor). Henry Corbin. Cahier de l'Herne, no. 39. Consacré à Henry Corbin, 1981.
 _  La logique des Orientaux: Henry Corbin et la science des formes. Éditions du Seuil, 1983.
 Giuliano, Glauco. Il Pellegrinaggio in Oriente di Henry Corbin. Con una scelta di testi. Lavis (Trento-Italia), La Finestra editrice, 2003.
 Giuliano, Glauco. Nîtârtha. Saggi per un pensiero eurasiatico. Lavis (Trento-Italia), La Finestra editrice, 2004.
 Giuliano, Glauco. L'Immagine del Tempo in Henry Corbin. Verso un'idiochronia angelomorfica. Milano-Udine, Mimesis, 2009.
 Landolt, Hermann. "Henry Corbin, 1903-1978: Between Philosophy and Orientalism," Journal of the American Oriental Society, 119(3): 484-490, 1999.
 Morris, James. The Reflective Heart: Discovering Spiritual Intelligence in Ibn 'Arabi's Meccan Illuminations. Fons Vitae, 2005.
Nasr, Seyyed Hossein. “Henry Corbin: The Life and Works of the Occidental Exile in Quest of the Orient of Light,” ch. 17, in S.H. Nasr, Traditional Islam in the Modern World. KPI, 1987.
 Shayegan, Daryush. Henry Corbin penseur de l'Islam spirituel, Paris, Albin Michel, 2010, 428 p. 
 Suhrawardi, Yahyá ibn Habash. The philosophy of illumination: A new critical edition of the text of Hikmat al-Ishraq, with English translation, notes, commentary, and introduction by John Walbridge and Hossein Ziai. Brigham Young University Press, 1999.

 Varzi, Roxanne. "Iran's French Revolution: Religion, Philosophy, and Crowds", The Annals of the American Academy of Political and Social Science, vol. 637, issue 1, pp. 53 – 63, July 25, 2011

External links 
Official website
 Association des Amis de Henry et Stella Corbin (French/English)

Tom Cheetham's Corbin blog
 The Legacy of Henry Corbin

Articles
 Corbin, Henry (1903–1978).  Encyclopedia of philosophy.
 From 'Heidegger to Suhrawardi': An Introduction to the thought of Henry Corbin
 Between Heidegger and the Hidden Imam: Reflections on Henry Corbin's approaches to mystical Islam 

1903 births
1978 deaths
Writers from Paris
Institut Catholique de Paris alumni
University of Paris alumni
Academic staff of the University of Paris
French historians of philosophy
French orientalists
French former Christians
French historians of religion
French Iranologists
French Islamic studies scholars
20th-century French philosophers
Heidegger scholars
20th-century French translators
Arabic–French translators
Persian-French translators
Scholars of Sufism
Ibn Arabi scholars
Traditionalist School